= Goody's 500 =

Goody's 500 or Goody's Headache Powder 500 may refer to several different NASCAR races:

- For the spring race at Martinsville Speedway from 1996 to 2000 and from 2007 to 2012, see Cook Out 400 (Martinsville)
- For the fall race at Martinsville Speedway from 1983 to 1995, see Xfinity 500
- For the race at Bristol Motor Speedway from 1994 to 1999, see Bass Pro Shops NRA Night Race
